Neurabin-1 is a protein that in humans is encoded by the PPP1R9A gene.

References

Further reading